KXRF-LP (100.3 FM) is a radio station licensed to serve the community of Dodge, North Dakota, and broadcasting to Dodge, Halliday, Golden Valley, Twin Buttes, and Zap. The station is owned by The Prairie Center Broadcasting. It airs an inspirational music format.

The station was assigned the KXRF-LP call letters by the Federal Communications Commission on February 26, 2014.

References

External links
 Official Website
 

XRF-LP
Radio stations established in 2015
2015 establishments in North Dakota
Contemporary Christian radio stations in the United States
Dunn County, North Dakota
XRF-LP